More and More or More & More may refer to:
 More & More (EP), a 2020 EP by Twice
 "More & More" (Twice song)
 "More and More" (Captain Hollywood Project song)
 "More and More" (Fleur East song)
 "More & More" (Joe song) (2003)
 "More and More" (Webb Pierce song)
 "More and More" (Andy Williams song)
 "More and More", a song by Blood Sweat & Tears from Blood, Sweat & Tears
 "More and More", a song by Israel & New Breed from Jesus at the Center: Live
 "More and More", a song by Diana Ross from Eaten Alive
 "More and More", a song written by Jerome Kern and E. Y. Harburg, from the 1944 musical Can't Help Singing